Furor Gallico is the first full-studio album by the Italian heavy/folk metal band Furor Gallico. The album was released in June 2010 in Milan, Italy.

Track listing 
Furor Gallico consists of the following tracks: 

Songs in Italian
Venti di Imbolc
Curmisagios (Western Lombard)
Medhelan
La Caccia Morta
Songs in English
Ancient Rites
Cathubodva
The Gods Have Returned
The Miraculous Child
Banshee
The Glorious Dawn
Instrumental Songs
Intro
Golden Spiral
Bright Eyes

References

2010 debut albums
Furor Gallico albums